A stöckli is a type of agricultural building traditionally found in Switzerland. It may also refer to:

People
 Béatrice Stöckli, Swiss missionary
 Franz Stöckli, Swiss bobsledder
 Fritz Stöckli, Swiss bobsledder
 Oliver Stöckli, Swiss footballer
 Ralph Stöckli, Swiss curler